Most Jannatul Ferdus Sumona (born 12 December 1999) is a Bangladeshi cricketer who plays as a right-handed batter and right-arm off break bowler. She made her Women's One Day International cricket (WODI) debut against South Africa on 6 May 2018. She made her WT20I debut for Bangladesh against South Africa Women on 20 May 2018.

In June 2018, she was part of Bangladesh's squad that won their first ever Women's Asia Cup title, winning the 2018 Women's Twenty20 Asia Cup tournament.

In February 2023, she began playing for Australian Capital Territory in the Women's National Cricket League.

References

External links
 
 

1999 births
Living people
People from Nilphamari District
Bangladeshi women cricketers
Bangladesh women One Day International cricketers
Bangladesh women Twenty20 International cricketers
Sylhet Division women cricketers
ACT Meteors cricketers